Babajimi Abiola "Jimi" Manuwa (born 18 February 1980) is an American-born English retired mixed martial artist who competed in the light heavyweight division of the Ultimate Fighting Championship.

Early life
Manuwa was born in California and lived there until three when his father moved the family back to Nigeria. He moved to London, England at ten.  He got in trouble as a teen and did not finish school.  After being convicted of conspiracy to burgle, he was sent to prison in 2002 and got out in 2003.

Mixed martial arts career
Manuwa began training in mixed martial arts in 2007, following a weight lifting injury where he ruptured a chest muscle. He currently trains at Keddles Gym with Alan Keddle and Dino Miringou and at Nova Força BJJ with Ricardo da Silva.

UCMMA
Manuwa began fighting for UCMMA name in only his third professional fight, becoming the promotion's champion in his third fight under them. He successfully defended his title 5 times, more than any other champion in the company, past or present.

During this time period, Manuwa famously turned down a contract offer from the Ultimate Fighting Championship, feeling it wasn't the right time in his career to accept it.  He did state that reaching the UFC was his "ultimate goal" in the future. He was then offered to fight at the UFC 138 event, but also refused that one, citing that he hadn't competed since summer of 2010, and that "If he fought on the October card that would have been after a fifteen-month layoff, which is not ideal under any circumstances. You do need to be fighting regularly to stay sharp..."

He successfully defended his title for the fifth time at UCMMA 24: Hands of War, against Nick Chapman.

BAMMA
After defending his title a record 5th time, Manuwa signed a four fight, exclusive contract with BAMMA. He made his debut at BAMMA 8. He faced Frenchman Antony Rea and won the fight via TKO.

Ultimate Fighting Championship
Having turned down a UFC contract a few years previously, Manuwa signed with the promotion in July 2012.

Manuwa made his UFC debut against TUF 8 contestant Kyle Kingsbury at UFC on Fuel TV 5, winning after 2 rounds by TKO due to doctor stoppage. The stoppage was declared after Kingsbury's left eye had swollen shut.

For his second fight with the promotion, Manuwa faced Cyrille Diabaté on 16 February 2013 at UFC on Fuel TV: Barão vs. McDonald. Manuwa was declared the winner (TKO) after Diabaté was unable to continue after tearing a calf muscle near the end of the first round.

Manuwa returned to face Ryan Jimmo on 26 October 2013 at UFC Fight Night 30. For the second time in a row, Manuwa's opponent injured his leg during the fight and this resulted in a TKO victory for Manuwa.

Manuwa faced Alexander Gustafsson at UFC Fight Night 37 on 8 March 2014. He lost the fight via TKO in the second round. Both participants were awarded a Fight of the Night bonus for the fight.

Manuwa was expected to face Maurício Rua at UFC Fight Night 56 on 8 November 2014 in Brazil. However, on 29 October, it was announced that Manuwa had pulled out of the fight due to an injury, and that Ovince St. Preux would replace him against Rua.

After over a year away from the sport, Manuwa returned to face Jan Błachowicz on 11 April 2015 at UFC Fight Night 64. Manuwa won the fight via unanimous decision, going the distance for the first and only time in his MMA career.

Manuwa faced Anthony Johnson on 5 September 2015 at UFC 191. He lost the fight via knockout early in the second round.

Manuwa was briefly linked to a matchup with Nikita Krylov on 27 February 2016 at UFC Fight Night 84. However, Manuwa was scratched from the contest with an undisclosed injury in late December, causing the bout to be cancelled.

Manuwa faced Ovince Saint Preux on 8 October 2016 at UFC 204. He won the fight via knockout in the second round and was awarded a Performance of the Night bonus.

Manuwa was briefly linked to a bout with Glover Teixeira at UFC 208. However, the pairing was scrapped and Manuwa eventually faced Corey Anderson on 18 March 2017 in the main event at UFC Fight Night 107. Manuwa won the fight via knockout in the first round, after briefly dropping Anderson with a jab and then finishing him with a single left hook. He was awarded a Performance of the Night bonus.

Manuwa faced Volkan Oezdemir on 29 July 2017 at UFC 214. He lost the fight by knockout in the first round.

Manuwa faced Jan Błachowicz in a rematch on 17 March 2018 at UFC Fight Night 127. He lost the fight via unanimous decision. Both participants were awarded Fight of the Night for their performance.

Manuwa was expected to face Glover Teixeira on 22 September 2018 at UFC Fight Night 137. However, Glover Teixeira pulled out this bout after suffering an injury. He was replaced by Thiago Santos.  In turn, Manuwa was removed from the fight during the week leading up to the event due to a torn hamstring and replaced by Eryk Anders.

Manuwa faced Thiago Santos on 8 December 2018 at UFC 231. He lost the fight via knockout in round two.

Manuwa faced Aleksandar Rakić on 1 June 2019 at UFC Fight Night 153. He lost the fight via knockout due to a head kick in the first round.

Manuwa announced his retirement on 3 June 2019.

Personal life
Manuwa's parents are Nigerian however he was born in California and spent his early years in Nigeria before settling in London at the age of 10. MTV UK did a documentary on MMA in the UK, with Manuwa, Jack Marshman and Cory Tait being filmed in the build-ups of their fights and the training and lifestyles involved.

In 2014, Manuwa showed off his tattoos for PETA's anti-fur "Ink Not Mink" ad campaign. Jimi was imprisoned for his role in a burglary ring in 2002. He was released in 2003.

Championships and accomplishments

Mixed martial arts
Ultimate Fighting Championship
Fight of the Night (Two times) vs. Alexander Gustafsson and Jan Błachowicz
Performance of the Night (Two time) vs. Ovince Saint Preux and Corey Anderson 
Ultimate Challenge MMA
UCMMA Light heavyweight Championship (One time; first)
Five successful title defenses
MMAjunkie.com
 2018 Round of the Year (Round 1) vs. Thiago Santos
 2018 December Fight of the Month vs. Thiago Santos

Mixed martial arts record

|-
|Loss
|align=center|17–6
|Aleksandar Rakić
|KO (head kick)
|UFC Fight Night: Gustafsson vs. Smith 
|
|align=center|1
|align=center|0:42
|Stockholm, Sweden
|
|-
|Loss
|align=center|17–5
|Thiago Santos
|KO (punch)
|UFC 231 
|
|align=center|2
|align=center|0:41
|Toronto, Ontario, Canada
|
|-
|Loss
|align=center|17–4
|Jan Błachowicz
|Decision (unanimous)
|UFC Fight Night: Werdum vs. Volkov 
|
|align=center|3
|align=center|5:00
|London, England
|
|-
|-
|Loss
|align=center|17–3
|Volkan Oezdemir
|KO (punches)
|UFC 214
|
|align=center|1
|align=center|0:42
|Anaheim, California, United States
| 
|-
|Win
|align=center|17–2
|Corey Anderson
|KO (punch)
|UFC Fight Night: Manuwa vs. Anderson
|
|align=center|1
|align=center|3:05
|London, England
|
|-
| Win
| align=center| 16–2
| Ovince Saint Preux
| KO (punch)
| UFC 204
| 
| align=center| 2
| align=center| 2:38
| Manchester, England
| 
|-
| Loss
| align=center| 15–2
| Anthony Johnson
| KO (punches)
| UFC 191
| 
| align=center| 2
| align=center| 0:28
| Las Vegas, Nevada, United States
|
|-
| Win
| align=center| 15–1
| Jan Błachowicz
| Decision (unanimous)
| UFC Fight Night: Gonzaga vs. Cro Cop 2
| 
| align=center| 3
| align=center| 5:00
| Kraków, Poland
| 
|-
| Loss
| align=center| 14–1
| Alexander Gustafsson
| TKO (knee and punches)
| UFC Fight Night: Gustafsson vs. Manuwa
| 
| align=center| 2
| align=center| 1:18
| London, England
| 
|-
| Win
| align=center| 14–0
| Ryan Jimmo
| TKO (leg injury)
| UFC Fight Night: Machida vs. Munoz
| 
| align=center| 2
| align=center| 4:41
| Manchester, England
| 
|-
| Win
| align=center| 13–0
| Cyrille Diabaté
| TKO (retirement)
| UFC on Fuel TV: Barão vs. McDonald
| 
| align=center| 1
| align=center| 5:00
| London, England
| 
|-
| Win
| align=center| 12–0
| Kyle Kingsbury
| TKO (doctor stoppage)
| UFC on Fuel TV: Struve vs. Miocic
| 
| align=center| 2
| align=center| 5:00
| Nottingham, England
| 
|-
| Win
| align=center| 11–0
| Antony Rea
| TKO (retirement)
|BAMMA 8
| 
| align=center| 1
| align=center| 5:00
| Nottingham, England
| 
|-
| Win
| align=center| 10–0 
| Nick Chapman
| TKO (knees)
| UCMMA 24: Hands of War
| 
| align=center| 1
| align=center| 2:14
| London, England
| 
|-
| Win
| align=center| 9–0 
| Valentino Petrescu
| KO (punch)
| UCMMA 14: Invincible
| 
| align=center| 1
| align=center| 3:08
| London, England
| 
|-
| Win
| align=center| 8–0
| Reza Meldavian
| TKO (punches)
| UCMMA 12: Never Back Down
| 
| align=center| 1
| align=center| 3:19
| London, England
| 
|-
| Win
| align=center| 7–0
| Shaun Lomas
| TKO (punches)
| UCMMA 9: Fighting for Heroes
| 
| align=center| 1
| align=center| 3:58
| London, England
| 
|-
| Win
| align=center| 6–0
| Luke Blythe
| KO (punch)
| UCMMA 6: Payback
| 
| align=center| 2
| align=center| 4:22
| London, England
| 
|-
| Win
| align=center| 5–0
| Ryan Robinson
| TKO (punches)
| UCMMA 4: Relentless
| 
| align=center| 1
| align=center| 2:03
| London, England
| 
|-
| Win
| align=center| 4–0
| Jamie Hearn
| Submission (guillotine choke)
| UCMMA 2: Unbreakable
| 
| align=center| 1
| align=center| 1:49
| London, England
| 
|-
| Win
| align=center| 3–0
| Chris Greig
| TKO (punches)
| UCMMA 1: Unbreakable
| 
| align=center| 2
| align=center| 1:35
| London, England
| 
|-
| Win
| align=center| 2–0
| Dave Rintoul
| TKO (punch)
| FX3 9
| 
| align=center| 1
| align=center| 3:10
| Reading, England
| 
|-
| Win
| align=center| 1–0
| Tom King
| TKO (punches)
| FCFN 8 
| 
| align=center| 1
| align=center| 4:25
| |Portsmouth, England
|

See also
 List of current UFC fighters
 List of male mixed martial artists

References

External links
 
 

1980 births
English male mixed martial artists
Light heavyweight mixed martial artists
Mixed martial artists utilizing Brazilian jiu-jitsu
Living people
Sportspeople from California
English people of Nigerian descent
American emigrants to the United Kingdom
English people of Yoruba descent
English practitioners of Brazilian jiu-jitsu
American people of Yoruba descent
American practitioners of Brazilian jiu-jitsu
Yoruba sportspeople
Black British sportspeople
American sportspeople of Nigerian descent
Ultimate Fighting Championship male fighters